Just Tell Me That You Want Me: A Tribute to Fleetwood Mac is a tribute album produced by Randall Poster and Gelya Robb, featuring various indie rock artists covering Fleetwood Mac songs. It was released on August 14, 2012. The title refers to a lyric from the song "Tusk".

Critical reception

Rolling Stone compared the album favorably to Poster and Robb's 2011 tribute album, Rave On Buddy Holly. NPR's Stephen Thompson also compared this album and the producers' prior Buddy Holly tribute, saying they both "possess both a sense of cohesion and a reasonably high hit rate", giving highest praise to The New Pornographers' "perfect power-pop throwback" cover of "Think About Me", and noting that first part of the album was more pop in spirit than the "hazier, more dance-driven musings in the second".

Track listing

Charts

References

External links
 

2012 compilation albums
Fleetwood Mac tribute albums
Hear Music compilation albums
Indie rock compilation albums